Catalogue of the Archbishops of Gniezno is an illuminated manuscript by Jan Długosz. It was illustrated by Stanisław Samostrzelnik.

Description
It has 145 pages. It is in the collection of the National Library of Poland.

Analysis
The manuscript was commissioned by Cracow Bishop Piotr Tomicki. It was produced between 1531 and 1535.

References

External links

Catalogus archiepiscoporum Gnesnensium, Długosz, Jan (1415-1480), Polona

16th-century manuscripts
Christian illuminated manuscripts
Polish manuscripts